Joseph Hughes (18 September 1905 – 20 January 1960) was an Irish Fine Gael politician who served as a Teachta Dála (TD) for the Carlow–Kilkenny constituency from 1948 to 1960.

Hughes worked as a farmer in County Kilkenny before entering politics. He was elected as a Fine Gael TD at the 1948 general election for Carlow–Kilkenny, and held the seat until his death in 1960, aged 54. The resulting by-election for his seat was held on 23 June 1960 won by the Fianna Fáil candidate Patrick Teehan.

References

1905 births
1960 deaths
Fine Gael TDs
Members of the 13th Dáil
Members of the 14th Dáil
Members of the 15th Dáil
Members of the 16th Dáil
Irish farmers